Reuben Kendrick was a constable and state representative in Mississippi. He was born into slavery in Louisiana. He was appointed constable in Amite County, Mississippi in 1869 by Governor Adelbert Ames. He was elected to a seat in the Mississippi House of Representatives in 1871 and served from 1872 to 1875. He represented Amite County. He and other Mississippi state legislators were photographed in 1874 by E. von Seutter.

In 1876 he wrote the governor about being denied his right to vote.

See also
Reconstruction era
Mississippi Plan
African-American officeholders during and following the Reconstruction era

References

Works cited 
 

Year of birth missing
Year of death unknown
Members of the Mississippi House of Representatives
African-American state legislators in Mississippi